The Ministry of Lands and Land Resettlement is a government ministry, responsible for land reform in Zimbabwe. The incumbent is Douglas Mombeshora.

References

Government of Zimbabwe
Zimbabwe